Achaea violaceofascia is a species of moth of the family Erebidae first described by Max Saalmüller in 1891. It is found much of western Africa and on islands in the Indian Ocean.

References 

Achaea (moth)
Moths of Madagascar
Moths of Mauritius
Moths of Seychelles
Moths of Réunion
Erebid moths of Africa
Moths described in 1891